AT-11 may refer to:
 AT-11 Sniper, a guided antitank missile 
 AT-11 Kansan, a World War II training aircraft